Travis Banton (August 18, 1894 – February 2, 1958) was an American costume designer. He is perhaps best known for his long collaboration with actress Marlene Dietrich and director Josef von Sternberg. He is generally considered one of the most important Hollywood costume designers of the golden age.

Born in Waco, Texas, Banton moved to New York City as a child. He was educated at Columbia University and at the Art Students League of New York, where he studied art and fashion design.

An early apprenticeship with a high-society costume dressmaker earned him fame. When Mary Pickford selected one of his dresses for her wedding to Douglas Fairbanks, his reputation was established.

He opened his dressmaking salon in New York City, and soon was asked to create costumes for the Ziegfeld Follies. In 1924, Banton moved to Hollywood when Paramount contracted with him to create costumes for his first film, The Dressmaker from Paris.

Beginning with Norma Talmadge in Poppy, Banton designed clothing for Pola Negri and Clara Bow in the 1920s. In the 1930s and 1940s, Banton designed for Kay Francis, Lilyan Tashman, Sylvia Sidney, Gail Patrick, Helen Vinson, and Claudette Colbert. Ultimately, Banton may be best remembered for forging the style of such Hollywood icons as Carole Lombard, Marlene Dietrich, and Mae West. Dietrich and Banton had an especially close and successful collaboration. His work for Dietrich frequently is referenced by designers.

Glamour, subtle elegance, and exquisite fabrics endeared Banton to Hollywood's celebrated beauties and made him one of the more sought-after costume designers of his era. As viewings of such films as The Gilded Lily (1935) and Desire (1936) reveal, his costume designs were marked by form-flattering cuts (often on the bias), rich fabrics (such as satin and lamé), and extravagant textures (beads, fur, and feathers). He collaborated closely with directors and actresses in order to fulfil their vision.

When designer Howard Greer left Paramount, Banton was promoted to head designer and was responsible for dressing the studio's stars. Because of his worsening alcoholism, and according to some commentators, at the instigation of his assistant Edith Head, Banton was forced to leave Paramount. He returned to designing privately for loyal stars and occasionally designed for Twentieth Century-Fox from 1939 to 1941 and Universal from 1945 to 1948.

Notable design projects
 Clara Bow in It and Wings, 1927
 Kay Francis in Trouble in Paradise, 1932
 Mae West in I'm No Angel, 1933 and Belle of the Nineties, 1934
 Claudette Colbert in Cleopatra, 1934
 Loretta Young in The Crusades, 1935
  Marlene Dietrich in Morocco, 1930, Shanghai Express, 1932, The Scarlet Empress, 1934 and The Devil Is a Woman, 1935
 Carole Lombard in My Man Godfrey, 1936 Nothing Sacred, 1937 and Made for Each Other, 1939
 Dolores Costello in Yours for the Asking, 1936
 Linda Darnell in The Mark of Zorro, 1940
 Alice Faye in Lillian Russell and Tin Pan Alley, 1940
 Carmen Miranda in Down Argentine Way, 1940, and That Night in Rio, 1941
 Linda Darnell and Rita Hayworth in Blood and Sand, 1941
 Betty Grable in Moon Over Miami, 1941
 Rita Hayworth in Cover Girl, 1944
 Joan Bennett in Scarlet Street, 1945
 Merle Oberon in A Song to Remember, 1945
 Lucille Ball in Lover Come Back, 1946
 Joan Fontaine in Letter from an Unknown Woman, 1948

References
Chierichetti, David. Hollywood Costume Design, Harmony Books, 1977. .

External links

Travis Banton at Virtual History

1894 births
1958 deaths
American fashion designers
American costume designers
People from Waco, Texas
Burials at Forest Lawn Memorial Park (Glendale)